Marlango is a Spanish music band deeply influenced by Tom Waits. The members of the band are Leonor Watling, Alejandro Pelayo and Óscar Ybarra.

Discography

References

External links
 Official site

Spanish musical groups
Musical groups from Madrid